Olympia Zacharias (born 17 January 1986) is a Nauruan runner who competed at the 2003 World Championships in Athletics. She was her country's only athlete at that event in Paris. Her best distance is 100 m and her record in 2003 was 14.07 seconds with her personal best time being 13.17 seconds. In 2003, she was elected to lead her country's athletic association  for three years.

References

1986 births
Living people
Nauruan female sprinters
People from Denigomodu District